Augusta University (AU) is a public research university and academic medical center in Augusta, Georgia. It is a part of the University System of Georgia and has satellite medical campuses in Savannah, Albany, Rome, and Athens. It employs over 15,000 people, has more than 56,000 alumni, and is accredited by the Southern Association of Colleges and Schools.

The Augusta University Health System includes the 478-bed Augusta University Medical Center, the 154-bed Children's Hospital of Georgia, and more than 80 outpatient clinics.

Campus
Augusta University's main campus in Augusta, Georgia, encompasses more than 200 acres and has four local campuses. It is made up of the former campuses between Augusta State University and Georgia Health Sciences University, with additions from the University System of Georgia Board of Regents.

Health Sciences
The medical college of the university, its oldest and founding college, began as the Medical Academy of Georgia in 1828, moving into the now historic Old Medical College Building in 1835. The present Health Sciences campus was formed in 1913 as the college moved to the Newton building and expanded from there, with the Dugas Building in 1937 marking the earliest building currently on the campus. The first clinical facility opened as the Eugene Talmadge Memorial Hospital in 1956.

Located in Augusta's Medical District, the Health Sciences campus features all medical programs of the university, as well as the Health Sciences Building, Interdisciplinary Research Building, Wellness Center, Cancer Center, Medical College of Georgia, The Dental College of Georgia, and the College of Science and Mathematics.

The Health Sciences campus also contains the Augusta University Medical Center, the Children's Hospital of Georgia, and Augusta University's two residence halls, Oak Hall and Elm Hall, which opened in Fall 2016.

Summerville

The Summerville campus was originally used as a United States Army arsenal, established in downtown Augusta in 1816 and relocated to the campus in 1827. By the turn of the twentieth century, the arsenal's prominence waned, beginning with the Spanish–American War in that the arsenal produced manufacturing equipment, seacoast targets, and was a repair station. In World War I, the station repaired rifles and small arms, but produced ordnance material and fire control operations for World War II.

In 1955, the arsenal was closed, and two years later the land was given to the local Board of Education, which used it to open the Junior College of Augusta. In 1958, the name changed to Augusta College, and in 1996 to Augusta State University.

Located on Walton Way, the Summerville campus houses many of the undergraduate programs and the Jaguar Student Activities Center. The Maxwell Performing Arts Theatre, the History Walk, the Mary S. Byrd Gallery of Art, The Honors Program, and the Maxwell Alumni House are all found on this campus. In addition, the James M. Hull College of Business, College of Education and Human Development, and Pamplin College of Arts, Humanities, and Social Sciences are located here.

The campus was formerly well known for the Arsenal Oak, a tree that contained wood believed to be 250–400 years old, until it was cut down in June 2004 because of disease. A dedication ceremony of the replanting of the new Arsenal Oak took place on Friday, April 29, 2016, on the front lawn of the Benét House. The descendant was grown from an acorn of the original Arsenal Oak.

Forest Hills

Then-Augusta State University opened a second campus in 1991 for athletics, complete with a 3,800-seat arena—Christenberry Fieldhouse, named in 2003—and softball and baseball fields. The J. Fleming Norvell Golf House was added in 2007 with an adjacent driving range, putting green, and chipping area.

The campus contains Forest Hills Golf Club, home of the men's and women's golf teams and a public course available for play, and the 500-bed University Village student housing.

The Nathan Deal Campus for Innovation

The former Georgia Golf Hall of Fame riverfront property in Downtown Augusta has been developed to house the Augusta University Cyber Institute and the Georgia Cyber Innovation and Training Center which opened in July 2018. The Riverfront Campus was named in honor of Georgia Governor Nathan Deal who was on hand for the opening ceremony of the Hull-McKnight Building on the campus. The building is also the home of the university's newest School of Computer and Cyber Sciences. A second cyber building will open in December 2018 with potential plans to expand more on the property.

Other
Augusta University has three satellite campuses for medical student clinical study, in Albany, Rome, and Savannah.

Partnerships

UGA–MCG medical partnership

The College of Nursing has a satellite campus in Athens. AU's Medical College of Georgia (MCG) operates a partnership with the University of Georgia on the University of Georgia's new Health Sciences Campus, also in Athens.

In 2010, MCG partnered with the University of Georgia (UGA) to create the UGA-MCG Medical Partnership. The Medical Partnership combines the experience of one of the nation's first medical schools with the resources of one of the nation's most comprehensive leading nationally ranked research universities. The result is an education that allows medical students to reach their full potential in a unique and stimulating learning environment.

To accommodate its new Health Sciences Campus, in 2011 the University of Georgia acquired the 58-acre former U.S. Navy Supply Corps School which had extensive landscaped green spaces, more than 400 trees, and several historic buildings located on the hospital and medical office corridor of Prince Avenue near downtown Athens. After renovations and additions, in July 2012, the UGA-MCG Medical Partnership moved to the new University of Georgia Health Sciences Campus.

ECRH–AU medical partnership
East Central Regional Hospital, with two locations in Augusta and Gracewood, was taken over by Augusta University for administrative purposes in 2009 after it was considered for closure. The hospital specializes in behavioral health and mental disabilities. The university's College of Nursing is now actively involved in daily hospital activities including  hiring nurses for the hospital, partnering with other institutions to educate students in masters in nursing programs regarding mental healthcare, and utilizing a Dedicated Education Unit to help guide undergraduate nursing students in patient care.

US Army Cyber Center of Excellence at Fort Gordon–AU Cyber Institute partnership
Fort Gordon is home to the US Army Cyber Center of Excellence and the US Army Cyber Command. The partnership will strengthen the relationship between AU and ARCYBER by assisting soldiers transferring their training to the private sector as well as by sharing resources. The ribbon-cutting and opening ceremony of Augusta University's Cyber Institute took place in University Hall on the Summerville campus on Friday, September 16, 2016.

East Georgia State College Augusta
In 2013, East Georgia State College (EGSC), a University System of Georgia institution based in the rural city of Swainsboro, began a collaboration with AU to serve Augusta-area students who do not meet AU's freshman admission requirements. Students enrolled in the program are enrolled as EGSC students and attend classes on the Summerville Campus. After completing 30 semester hours of college level coursework and attaining a minimum GPA of 2.3, students can then elect to transfer into a bachelor's program at AU. This collaboration is modeled after EGSC's long-standing collaboration with Georgia Southern University and replaces the former "University College" program.

Medical illustration program 
Augusta University is one of four accredited programs offering a Masters of Science in Medical Illustration in North America in the college of Allied Health Science. The program is accredited by the Commission on Accreditation of Allied Health Education Programs (CAAHEP).

Athletics

Augusta athletic teams are the Jaguars. The university is a member of the Division II level of the National Collegiate Athletic Association (NCAA), primarily competing in the Peach Belt Conference (PBC) since the 1991–92 academic year; except in women's and men's golf, which those sports compete in the NCAA Division I level as an affiliate member of the Southland Conference.

Augusta competes in 13 intercollegiate varsity sports: Men's sports include baseball, basketball, cross country, golf, tennis & track & field; while women's sports include basketball, cross country, golf, softball, tennis, track & field and volleyball.

Golf
The men's golf program captured the school's first NCAA Division I Men's Golf National Championship on June 6, 2010 in Ooltewah, Tennessee, when the Jaguars defeated Oklahoma State University. The Jags then became the first Division I men's golf program in 27 years to repeat as National Champions on June 5, 2011 when they defeated the University of Georgia at Karsten Creek Golf Club in Stillwater, Oklahoma.

Notable alumni and faculty
Notable alumni and faculty of Augusta University's predecessor institutions include:
Doug Barnard, Jr., Congressman
Chen Be-yue, Justice of the Constitutional Court of the Republic of China
John Britton, former professor, murdered by an anti-abortion extremist in 1994
Paul Broun, Congressman
Joelle Carter, actress
Jourdain Searles, journalist  
Edward J. Cashin, American historian; Professor emeritus of History; Director of the Center for the Study of Georgia History
Hervey M. Cleckley, co-author of the book The Three Faces of Eve
Judith Ortiz Cofer, author
Leila Denmark, pediatrician and medical researcher; co-developer of the pertussis vaccine
Michael T. Dugan, accounting academic; Professor of Accounting at Augusta University 
Alissa Eckert, medical illustration class of 2006. Alissa is a medical illustrator who works for the Center for Disease Control who won an award and created the international image used for the COVID-19 virus. 
Phil Gingrey, Congressman
Isaac S. Hopkins, first President of Georgia Institute of Technology
Anthony Kellman, Professor of English and Creative Writing; poet, novelist and musician
Darrell Kirch, AAMC president
Marguerite Littleton Kearney, director, Division of Extramural Science Programs, National Institute of Nursing Research
Michael Patrick Mulroy, Deputy Assistant Secretary of Defense for Secretary James Mattis
Simona Hunyadi Murph, Scientist, Engineer & Inventor at Savannah River National Laboratory; Adjunct Professor at University of Georgia
Matthew L. Nathan, 37th Surgeon General of the United States Navy
Dr. No-Hee Park, Dean, UCLA School of Dentistry and notable researcher of oral (head and neck) cancer and aging research
Patrick Reed, PGA Tour golfer
Garret Siler, former NBA basketball player, currently holds the NCAA record for field goal percentage
Greg Swayne, medical illustration class of 1984. "Greg Swayne has been a pioneer in e-health since its infancy when as a Medical Illustrator, he created the idea for and co-founded A.D.A.M. in 1990".
 Ed Tarver, United States Attorney
Corbett H. Thigpen, co-author of the book The Three Faces of Eve

See also

 History of Augusta University
 Old Medical College
 Medical College of Georgia
 Augusta University Medical Center
 UGA–AU medical partnership
 Medical District (Augusta, Georgia)
 Stephen Vincent Benet House
 List of medical schools in the United States
 List of nursing schools in the United States
 List of dental schools in the United States

References

External links

 Official website
 Official athletics website
 Historical Images of the Medical College Collection, Digital Library of Georgia
 National Park Service "Discover Our Shared Heritage" travel itinerary

 
Universities and colleges accredited by the Southern Association of Colleges and Schools
Universities and colleges formed by merger in the United States
Educational institutions established in 1828
Education in Augusta, Georgia
Public universities and colleges in Georgia (U.S. state)
Economy of Augusta, Georgia
Buildings and structures in Augusta, Georgia
University System of Georgia